Dance Macabre is a 1992 American slasher film written and directed by Greydon Clark, and starring Robert Englund, Michelle Zeitlin, Irina Davidoff, and Alexander Sergeyev. It follows an American dancer at an academy in Saint Petersburg, where a series of murders and disappearances begin taking place.

Plot
At a dance academy outside Saint Petersburg, crippled Madame Gordenko, head of the academy, greets her new cohort along with American dance instructor Anthony, and Olga, another teacher. Anthony is quickly taken by Jessica Anderson, an American who resembles Anthony's deceased lover Svetlana—a Russian ballet dancer who died in a motorbike crash in New York City. During the first ballet class, Jessica struggles. Claudine, Jessica's roommate, helps teach her new moves before going to the spa. Jessica remains in the studio and dances the way she prefers which is to fast rock music. In the spa, an unseen stranger drowns Claudine in the hot tub. When Jessica arrives at the spa, Claudine is missing. She meets Alex, a photographer who has been sneaking into the academy to take pictures of Anthony and Gordenko. He and Jessica are interested in each other and she goes for a ride with him on his motorbike. The next morning, Olga informs Jessica that Claudine left the academy. During the next lesson, Gordenko has Jessica dance with a girl called Angela. Although Jessica still struggles, Gordenko tells Olga that she sees talent in her. Later Jessica finds a girl called Ingrid dancing in the attic and learns that she is addicted to drinking and drugs. Jessica goes to Anthony who offers to help Jessica with her dancing; she accepts, and he gives her a private lesson.

The following day, during a theatre recital with male dancers, a distracted Angela grabs her male partner's groin. Olga orders Angela to wait in the wings, where the killer hangs her to death from a rafter. Jessica soon realizes Angela is missing. Madame Gordenko informs the girls that something might have happened to Angela, but Ingrid assures everyone that Angela must be alright. In class, the dancers watch a girl called Natasha dancing beautifully. That night Anthony and Olga take the girls to a night club in the city. Alex turns up and dances with Jessica before kissing her. Anthony sees them kissing and leaves the club. Natasha leaves to walk her boyfriend Ivan to the station. After Ivan's train leaves, the stranger returns and pushes her onto the tracks in front of an oncoming train. That night Anthony witnesses Alex climbing up to Jessica's room and he starts crying. Alex and Jessica have sex and sleep together.

The next morning Anthony informs the girls of Natasha's death. Later, Ingrid returns to the attic; the stranger - shown to be Gordenko - hits Ingrid with her cane and throws her from a high window. Because of the deaths, most of the students in the academy leave. Anthony tells Olga that Jessica is the only good dancer left and she should be the one to represent the academy at an upcoming special audition. Jessica sees Alex sneaking into Anthony's quarters and hurries to find him, but Olga finds him first. In a locked cupboard, the two find Claudine and Angela's bodies. Alex is stabbed in the stomach by Gordenko and dies. Olga pulls out the dagger just as Jessica walks in. After a struggle, Olga accidentally stabs herself just as Anthony walks in. He holds the dying Olga in his arms and she whispers "Our secret is safe".

All of the other students withdraw. However, Jessica, encouraged by Anthony, decides to remain at the academy and attend the audition. Anthony continues to give her lessons to prepare her, dressing her in a brunette wig to resemble Svetlana. On the day before the audition, Jessica asks Anthony permission to see Madame Gordenko. When she enters Gordenko's room she finds her looking sick; she then violently grabs Jessica's arm. Jessica flees, screaming for Anthony, but he has vanished. She then hears Anthony's voice coming from inside Gordenko's room. When she re-enters, Gordenko is alone. She attacks Jessica. When Gordenko speaks to her, Anthony's voice comes out of her mouth. It is revealed that Madame Gordenko is in fact Anthony, who possesses a split personality. He tries to convince Jessica that she is his beloved Svetlana. He approaches her with a syringe and she blacks out.

Jessica awakens in bed, and finds a bouquet of roses on her table from Anthony which is addressed to Svetlana. He enters her room—now calling her Svetlana—and tells her to get ready for the audition. Jessica refuses but Anthony threatens her with a gun, so she complies. At the audition Jessica first dances to Anthony's choreography while he watches from the wings. She then runs into the wings, rips off the brunette wig and shouts that she is not Svetlana. She returns onstage and dances the way she prefers, which amazes the judges. Gordenko's persona suddenly takes control of his body and forces him up onto one of the balconies to shoot Jessica. Anthony rebels against Gordenko and throws himself off of the balcony to save Jessica's life. She rushes to his side and just before he dies, he tells her "You danced for me".

Cast

Production
The film was originally developed as a sequel to the earlier 21st Century Englund-starring vehicle The Phantom of the Opera, under the title Terror of Manhattan

Release
The film was released direct-to-video in the United States by Columbia TriStar Home Video on September 16, 1992. It had previously been released in Germany in May of that year.

It was misleadingly labeled in Japan as being a sequel to the 1989 movie adaptation of The Phantom of the Opera (also starring Robert Englund).

Home media
Following its original VHS release in 1992, Dance Macabre was given a DVD release in 2015 through MGM Home Entertainment's "Limited Edition Collection" line. Scream Factory released the film on Blu-ray in 2017.

References

Sources

External links
 
 
 

1992 films
1992 direct-to-video films
1992 horror films
1990s English-language films
1990s dance films
1990s slasher films
American slasher films
Cross-dressing in American films
Direct-to-video horror films
Films about ballet
Films about dissociative identity disorder
Films directed by Greydon Clark
Films produced by Menahem Golan
Films set in Russia
Films shot in Saint Petersburg
21st Century Film Corporation films
1990s American films